The Sky Pilot is a 1921 American silent drama film based on the novel of the same name by Ralph Connor. It is directed by King Vidor and features Colleen Moore. In February 2020, the film was shown in a newly restored version at the 70th Berlin International Film Festival, as part of a retrospective dedicated to King Vidor's career.

Plot
The Sky Pilot (Bowers) arrives in a small rough-and-tumble cattle town in Canada, intent on bringing religion to its tough residents. At first they reject him, but in time he wins the residents over with his prowess. A plot to steal cattle is uncovered and disrupted. Gwen, daughter of the "Old Timer," is injured in a stampede, loses her ability to walk, but recovers thanks to the power of love.

Cast
 John Bowers as The Sky Pilot
 Colleen Moore as Gwen
 David Butler as Bill Hendricks
 Harry Todd as The Old Timer
 James Corrigan as Honorable Ashley
 Donald MacDonald as The Duke
 Kathleen Kirkham as Lady Charlotte

Production
The Sky Pilot was filmed in part at Vidor's new studio, Vidor Village and marked a break from the “stage-bound” feature The Family Honor (1920), a comedy-romance he had just completed for First National exhibitors. Shot largely in the High Sierra near Truckee, California, this big budget western was plagued by bad weather. Costly efforts to create landscapes on location produced budget overruns diminishing the profitability of the film. First National released the picture but declined to finance any further film projects by Vidor.

These financial setbacks signaled the demise of King Vidor Productions. Courts ordered the dismantling of Vidor Village, and though Vidor would briefly regain control of the studio operations there were not revived. He sold the property in January 1923.

Vidor and his leading lady, Colleen Moore, fell in love during the filming of The Sky Pilot. Vidor and Moore would pursue their love affair until 1924. Married at the time to his childhood sweetheart and film actress Florence Vidor, Vidor and his spouse divorced in 1926.

Theme
The film serves to showcase Vidor's faith in the power of positive thinking, free of puritanism or Christian moralizing, which celebrates the virtues of self-reliance and the inherent vitality of rural communities.

The precise theme of the film remains ambiguous. According to sources, Vidor attempts to entertain the audience with a light farce and sanctimoniously impress them with spectacular natural scenery, the latter "which is closest to Vidor’s heart." The redemptive value of "individualist" faith provides a subtext for the movie, as John Bowers as the manly Sky Pilot adroitly converts local ruffians to Christian-like virtues. When cowboy Bill Hendricks (David Butler is bested by the Sky Pilot in a fist fight he confesses: "When a man’s religion will let him do what you done and live, there must something in it."

DVD release
The Sky Pilot was also released on Region 0 DVD-R by Alpha Video on January 28, 2014.

Footnotes

References
Baxter, John. 1976. King Vidor. Simon & Schuster, Inc. Monarch Film Studies. LOC Card Number 75-23544.
Durgnat, Raymond and Simmon, Scott. 1988. King Vidor, American. University of California Press, Berkeley. 
Higham, Charles. 1972. "Long Live Vidor, A Hollywood King" https://www.nytimes.com/1972/09/03/archives/long-live-vidor-a-hollywood-king-long-live-vidor-who-was-a-king-of.html   Retrieved June 10, 2020
Tonguette, Peter. 2011. Journey to Galveston: An Interview with Catherine Berge on King Vidor. Senses of Cinema, June 2011  Feature Articles  Issue 59. http://sensesofcinema.com/2011/feature-articles/journey-to-galveston-an-interview-with-catherine-berge-on-king-vidor-2/   Retrieved June 10, 2020

External links

1921 films
1921 drama films
Silent American drama films
American silent feature films
American black-and-white films
American aviation films
Films based on Canadian novels
Films directed by King Vidor
First National Pictures films
Films set in Alberta
1920s American films